Florian Wilmsmann (born 21 January 1996) is a German freestyle skier. He competed at the 2018 and 2022 Winter Olympics.

References

1996 births
Living people
Freestyle skiers at the 2018 Winter Olympics
Freestyle skiers at the 2022 Winter Olympics
German male freestyle skiers
Olympic freestyle skiers of Germany
Universiade bronze medalists for Germany
Universiade medalists in freestyle skiing
Competitors at the 2019 Winter Universiade
21st-century German people